Katie Jane Hillier (born 2 May 1974) is a British fashion designer, mostly bags and accessories.

Career
Hillier has created bags, jewellery and other accessories for labels including Marc Jacobs, Loewe, Asprey, and Victoria Beckham.

In 2010, she launched her own jewellery label, Hillier.

In May 2013, she became creative director of Marc by Marc Jacobs, but the label closed in March 2015.

In 2015, she launched Hillier Bartley with fellow designer and friend Luella Bartley. Both designers had been creative directors for Marc by Marc Jacobs before they launched their own line, which retails at Liberty, Matches, and Selfridges in the UK, among other locations in the United States, United Arab Emirates, and Japan. 

In 2019, Hillier was named creative director of J&M Davidson, and designed her first collection of ready-to-wear and accessories for the brand in autumn of that year.

Personal life
Hillier was in a relationship with fellow designer Patrick Grant from 2007 to 2015.

She has been in a relationship with American artist Jeff West since 2016, and they held a commitment ceremony in Kenya on 20 April 2019. They live in Hudson, New York.

References

Living people
Fashion designers from London
British women fashion designers
1974 births
People from the London Borough of Hammersmith and Fulham